Xenofon Fetsis (born 5 May 1991) is a Greek footballer, who plays as a midfielder for Tilikratis.

Career
He made his superleague debut on 18 April 2010 with Panthinaikos in a match against PAS Giannina.

References

External links

Profile at Onsports.gr

1991 births
Living people
Super League Greece players
A.E. Karaiskakis F.C. players
Panathinaikos F.C. players
AEK Athens F.C. players
A.O. Glyfada players
Ethnikos Piraeus F.C. players
Tilikratis F.C. players
Association football midfielders
Doxa Vyronas F.C. players
Footballers from Athens
Greek footballers